Emmette "Em" Bryant (born November 4, 1937) is a retired American professional basketball player and Vice President/Chicago Chapter at NBA Alumni.

Career
A 6'1" guard from DePaul University, Bryant was drafted in the 1964 NBA Draft by the New York Knicks.  After his time in New York, he joined the Boston Celtics and instantly became a part of the most dominant dynasty in American professional basketball history.  He was a key component of the 1969 Celtics NBA championship team, contributing 20 points in the Celtics’ victory over Jerry West's Los Angeles Lakers in game seven of the 1969 NBA Finals.  The win gave the Celtics their 11th championship in 13 years.  Bryant spent the latter part of his career with the Buffalo Braves, who selected him in the 1970 expansion draft.  He retired from the league in 1972.  Altogether Bryant played eight seasons (1964–1972) in the National Basketball Association (NBA) as a member of the New York Knicks, Boston Celtics, and Buffalo Braves, scoring 3,722 points in his career.

Post basketball
Immediately after his playing days, Bryant became an assistant coach:  one year at Columbia University and two years with Bill Russell at the NBA's Seattle SuperSonics, now the Oklahoma Thunder, during 1973–1974.  All along the way, Bryant would say, “I’m just a teacher that happened to play pro ball.”  Bryant then went to work for the State of Washington for the next 30 years, starting out with the Department of Social and Health Services, in charge of recreation throughout the state for that department's correctional institutions.  He later became the Recreation Director at Mission Creek Youth Camp.

Em is active in retired basketball players activities and was a key member of the executive board of the National Retired Players Association.  Em is in the ChicagoLand Sports Hall of Fame 2010, DePaul Hall of Fame, and Rucker Professional Basketball Hall of Fame.

External links
Career statistics

1937 births
Living people
American men's basketball players
Basketball players from Chicago
Boston Celtics players
Buffalo Braves expansion draft picks
Buffalo Braves players
Columbia Lions men's basketball coaches
DePaul Blue Demons men's basketball players
New York Knicks draft picks
New York Knicks players
Phoenix Suns expansion draft picks
Point guards
Seattle SuperSonics assistant coaches
Shooting guards